Tapong is a village in the Nicobar district of Andaman and Nicobar Islands, India.  It is located on the Nancowry Island, around 10 km from the Champin village, and comes under the administration of the Nancowry tehsil.

Demographics 

A census taken by a research team after the 2004 Indian Ocean tsunami recorded a population of 296 in Tapong: the tsunami did not cause any deaths in the village.

The 2011 census of India recorded the population of Tapong (including Kabila settlement) as 270, and the number of households as 62. The effective literacy rate (i.e. the literacy rate of population excluding children aged 6 and below) was 83.41%.

References 

Villages in Nancowry tehsil